The Roman Catholic Archdiocese of Ottawa–Cornwall is a Catholic archdiocese that includes part of the Province of Ontario and includes the suffragan dioceses of Hearst, Pembroke, and Timmins. On 6 May 2020, Pope Francis amalgamated the Archdiocese of Ottawa and the Diocese of Alexandria-Cornwall to create the Archdiocese of Ottawa–Cornwall.

The Diocese of Bytown was erected on 25 June 1847. Its name was changed to the Diocese of Ottawa on 14 June 1860. It was elevated to archdiocese status on 8 June 1886. As of 2004, the archdiocese contained 111 parishes, 177 active diocesan priests, 102 religious priests, and 400,000 Catholics.  It also has 848 Women Religious, 147 Religious Brothers, and 60 permanent deacons.

Leadership
Bishops and archbishops of Ottawa
Joseph-Eugène-Bruno Guigues (1847–1874)
Joseph-Thomas Duhamel (1874–1909)
Charles-Hughes Gauthier (1910–1922)
Joseph-Médard Émard (1922–1927)
Joseph-Guillaume-Laurent Forbes (1928–1940)
Alexandre Vachon (1940–1953)
Marie-Joseph Lemieux (1953–1966), appointed titular Archbishop and nuncio
Joseph-Aurèle Plourde (1967–1989)
Marcel André J. Gervais (1989–2007)
Terrence Prendergast, S.J. (2007–2020)
Archbishops of Ottawa-Cornwall
Terrence Prendergast (2020)
Marcel Damphousse (2020)

Coadjutor bishops
Alexandre Vachon (1939-1940)
Marcel André J. Gervais (1989)
Marcel Damphousse (2020)

Auxiliary bishops

Former 
Maxime Tessier (1951-1953), appointed Coadjutor Bishop of Timmins, Ontario
Paul-Émile Charbonneau (1960-1963), appointed Bishop of Hull, Québec
Joseph Raymond Windle (1960-1969), appointed Coadjutor Bishop of Pembroke, Ontario
René Audet (1963-1968), appointed Bishop of Joliette, Québec
John Michael Behan (1977-1988)
Gilles Bélisle (1977-1993)
Brendan Michael O'Brien (1987-1993), appointed Bishop of Pembroke, Ontario
Paul Marchand, SSM (1993-1999), appointed Bishop of Timmins, Ontario
Frederick Joseph Colli (1994-1999), appointed Bishop of Thunder Bay, Ontario
Christian Riesbeck, CC (2014-2019), appointed Bishop of Saint John, New Brunswick
Yvan Mathieu, s.m., (2022- )

Other priests of this diocese who became bishops
 John Thomas McNally, appointed Bishop of Calgary, Alberta in 1913
 François-Xavier Brunet, appointed Bishop of Mont-Laurier, Québec in 1913
 Joseph Charbonneau, appointed Bishop of Hearst, Ontario in 1939
 Jean Gratton, appointed Bishop of Mont-Laurier, Québec in 1978
 Jean-Louis Plouffe, appointed Auxiliary Bishop of Sault Sainte Marie, Ontario in 1986
 José Avelino Bettencourt, appointed nuncio and titular Archbishop in 2018

References

Bibliography

Archdiocese of Ottawa page at catholichierarchy.org  retrieved July 13, 2006

External links 
Archdiocese of Ottawa site

 
Organizations based in Ottawa